Castelo may refer to:

Places

Brazil
 Castelo, Espírito Santo, a municipality in the State of Espírito Santo
 Castelo (Rio de Janeiro), a neighbourhood in the city of Rio de Janeiro

Portugal
 Castelo (Lisbon), a civil parish in the municipality of Lisbon
 Castelo (Moimenta da Beira), a civil parish in the municipality of Moimenta da Beira
 Castelo (Sertã), a civil parish in the municipality of Sertã
 Castelo (Sesimbra), a civil parish in the municipality of Sesimbra
 Santa Maria do Castelo e São Miguel (Torres Vedras), a civil parish in the municipality of Torres Vedras
 Castelo do Neiva (Viana do Castelo), a civil parish in the municipality of Viana do Castelo

Other
 Castelo Futebol Clube, a Brazilian football (soccer) club